The sebastos Constantine Doukas (died 8 April 1179) was a Byzantine general and provincial governor under Emperor Manuel I Komnenos. His relation with the prestigious Doukas family is unknown. What little is known of him comes from a short biographical notice in a manuscript (Par. gr. 1564, fol. 18r). According to it, in 1173 Emperor Manuel sent Constantine to help defend Ancona in Italy, a Byzantine ally, against a combined attack from Holy Roman Emperor Frederick I Barbarossa and the Republic of Venice. The siege lasted for seven months, but Constantine successfully defended the city from capture. Subsequently, he was sent as governor (doux) in Dalmatia and Dyrrhachium. He died of pleurisy at his home on 8 April 1179.

References

Sources 
 

12th-century births
1179 deaths
12th-century Byzantine people
Byzantine generals
Byzantine governors
Ancona
Constantine
Generals of Manuel I Komnenos
Sebastoi
Byzantine Dalmatia